Ako Ang Simula is a public service show broadcast on ABS-CBN through ABS-CBN News and Current Affairs. It is hosted by Karen Davila, Anthony Taberna and Atty. Pochoy Labog. It was launched on October 8, 2011 on ABS-CBN and encore broadcast also air over ABS-CBN News Channel every Sunday October 9, 2011.

Overview
Ako Ang Simula was based on an election campaign was launched on May 11, 2009 and was its banner for the network's coverage of the 2010 Presidential Elections.

Host
 Karen Davila
 Anthony Taberna 
 Atty. Pochoy Labog

See also
List of programs aired by ABS-CBN
List of programs shown on the ABS-CBN News Channel

External links

 

2011 Philippine television series debuts
2013 Philippine television series endings
ABS-CBN original programming
ABS-CBN News and Current Affairs shows
Filipino-language television shows